The canton of Tulle is an administrative division of the Corrèze department, south-central France. It was created at the French canton reorganisation which came into effect in March 2015. Its seat is in Tulle.

It consists of the following communes:
Tulle

References

Cantons of Corrèze